Pike is an unincorporated community in Washington Township, Boone County, in the U.S. state of Indiana.

History
The first post office at Pike was called Pikes Crossing, in 1885. It was so named from its location at the crossing of a turnpike. The post office was later renamed Pike, and was discontinued in 1900.

Geography

References

Unincorporated communities in Boone County, Indiana
Unincorporated communities in Indiana
Indianapolis metropolitan area